Luise Dorothea of Saxe-Meiningen (10 August 1710 – 22 October 1767) was a member of German royalty. She was born in Meiningen, the daughter of Ernst Ludwig I, Duke of Saxe-Meiningen and Dorothea Marie of Saxe-Gotha. She was Duchess of Saxe-Gotha-Altenburg as the wife of Frederick III, Duke of Saxe-Gotha-Altenburg.

Marriage and issue
On 17 September 1729 in Meiningen, Luise married Frederick III, Duke of Saxe-Gotha-Altenburg, her first cousin. They had nine children:
 Frederick Louis, Hereditary Prince of Saxe-Gotha-Altenburg (b. Gotha, 20 January 1735 – d. Gotha, 9 June 1756).
 Louis (b. Gotha, 25 October 1735 – d. Gotha, 26 October 1735).
 stillborn son (Gotha, 25 October 1735), twin of Louis.
 stillborn twin sons (1739).
 Fredericka Louise (b. Gotha, 30 January 1741 – d. Gotha, 5 February 1776).
 Ernest II, Duke of Saxe-Gotha-Altenburg (b. Gotha, 30 January 1745 – d. Gotha, 20 April 1804).
 Sophie (b. Gotha, 9 March 1746 – d. Gotha, 30 March 1746).
 August (b. Gotha, 14 August 1747 – d. Gotha, 28 September 1806).

Luise died in Gotha, aged 57.

Ancestry

References

|-

House of Saxe-Gotha-Altenburg
House of Saxe-Meiningen
People from Gotha (town)
1710 births
1767 deaths
Princesses of Saxe-Meiningen
Princesses of Saxe-Gotha-Altenburg
Duchesses of Saxe-Gotha-Altenburg
Daughters of monarchs